The sharp-tailed starling (Lamprotornis acuticaudus), also known as the sharp-tailed glossy-starling, is a species of starling in the family Sturnidae.

Range
It inhabits open woodland (namely miombo) in Angola, northern Botswana, the southern DRC, northern Namibia, western Tanzania, and Zambia.

References

External links
Sharp-tailed starling - Species text in The Atlas of Southern African Birds

sharp-tailed starling
Birds of Southern Africa
Sharp-tailed starling
Taxonomy articles created by Polbot